Sikandra Rao is a town in  Hathras district of Uttar Pradesh. It is one of the three assembly constituencies of the district and a Municipal board. The current MLA from the constituency is senior BJP leader Birendra Singh Rana.The town is located on N.H.91 and is connected to Aligarh and Etah District. The nearest airport to the town is Agra Airport.

Demographics 

 the census found a population of 38,485. Males constitute 52% of the population and females 48%. 17% of the population is under 6 years of age.

References

Cities and towns in Hathras district